Mota Bhamodra is a village in Savarkundla Taluka of Amreli district, Gujarat, India.

History
Formerly Bhamodra was known for its iron-works and the steel produced was famous in the neighbourhood for sword blades, which were styled as being of the Bhamodra ore.

Ancient coins are often found at Bhamodra ; amongst these was one of Apollodotus I, besides others of the Western Satraps, Gupta, and Maitraka kings. To the south of the village is a large tank, of which, the northern bank alone has been built with masonry ; it appears of some antiquity.

In this village, God Himself has come and completed the parcha.In a book called Sukhvilas.The name of Sukhram Bapu is very famous in this village.AD 18 was around.Ramdevpeer Maharaj himself is here in the village

Places of interest
About two miles south of Bhamodra is a small cave containing linga of Mahadev called the Kedarnath. There is a small kund or reservoir near the cave called the Kedar Kund. In the month of Shraavana or August, a small fair is held here in honour of the Kedarnath Mahadev.

Mota bhamodra have one temple of Shri SukharamBapu, all villages are united due to this temple.

References

 This article incorporates text from a publication now in the public domain: 

Villages in Amreli district